Francisco Javier Falagán Hernández (born 4 October 1969) is a Spanish retired footballer who played as a goalkeeper, and is the goalkeeping coach of Extremadura UD.

Football career
Born in Valladolid, Castile and León, Falagán played in the lower leagues until 1993, when he represented Hércules CF in Segunda División loaned by neighbouring Valencia CF. Whilst with the former club, he had already won promotion to that tier in 1993.

In 1995–96, Falagán played all 42 matches in La Liga with SD Compostela, his solid performances earning him a place in Javier Clemente's shortlist for UEFA Euro 1996 as one of the five goalkeepers. In the following season he appeared significantly less, but still managed to be the most used player in his position as the Galicians again retained their league status.

Falagán played three more seasons in the second level, with Hércules and CP Mérida. He retired at the end of the 1999–2000 campaign at the age of only 30, due to injury.

Falagán later worked as a goalkeeper coach, with Porriño CF, CD Casablanca, Gran Peña FC, Coruxo FC and Extremadura UD. He then continued coaching goalkeepers at Chinese club Guangzhou Evergrande.

References

External links

1969 births
Living people
Footballers from Valladolid
Spanish footballers
Association football goalkeepers
La Liga players
Segunda División players
Segunda División B players
Tercera División players
Coruxo FC players
Sevilla Atlético players
Getafe CF footballers
CD Fuengirola players
Hércules CF players
Valencia CF players
SD Compostela footballers
CP Mérida footballers
Spanish football managers